Martin Kree (born 27 January 1965) is a German former footballer, who played mostly as a central defender.

During a 15-year professional career, Kree played 401 Bundesliga games for VfL Bochum, Bayer 04 Leverkusen and Borussia Dortmund.

Career
Born in Wickede, North Rhine-Westphalia, Kree made his first division debuts with VfL Bochum in 1983–84 – seven matches, one goal – netting an impressive 12 goals in his sixth season (only three penalty kicks), while only missing six matches in his last four seasons combined.

After a further five seasons with Bayer 04 Leverkusen, playing in all 38 league matches with nine goals in the first campaign with teams from the re-unified Germany, Kree moved to Borussia Dortmund, where he won back-to-back league championships, the 1997 Champions League and the Intercontinental Cup, also in that year. During the club's Champions League victorious campaign, he played in eight matches (six complete, including the final).

Kree retired from football in 1998, aged 33.

Career statistics

References

External links
 
 

1965 births
Living people
German footballers
Association football defenders
Bundesliga players
VfL Bochum players
VfL Bochum II players
Bayer 04 Leverkusen players
Borussia Dortmund players
Germany B international footballers
Germany under-21 international footballers
UEFA Champions League winning players
Footballers from North Rhine-Westphalia
West German footballers